Pool 1 of the 1987 Rugby World Cup began on 23 May and was completed on 3 June. The pool was composed of Australia, England, United States and Japan.

Standings

Australia vs England

Japan vs United States

England vs Japan

Australia vs United States

England vs United States

Australia vs Japan

References

External links
 Official Rugby World Cup Site
 Full Results and Statistics at ESPN

Pool 1
1987 in American rugby union
1987 in Australian rugby union
1987–88 in Japanese rugby union
1987–88 in English rugby union